The 2014–15 All-Ireland Intermediate Club Hurling Championship was the 11th staging of the All-Ireland Intermediate Club Hurling Championship since its establishment by the Gaelic Athletic Association in 2004.

The All-Ireland final was played on 16 February 2015 at Croke Park in Dublin, between O’Donovan Rossa from Antrim and Kilburn Gaels from London. O'Donovan Rossa won the match by 1-09 to 2-03 to become the first Antrim club to claim the All-Ireland title.

Connacht Intermediate Club Hurling Championship

Connacht semi-final

Connacht final

Leinster Intermediate Club Hurling Championship

Leinster quarter-finals

Leinster semi-finals

Leinster final

Munster Intermediate Club Hurling Championship

Quarter-finals

Semi-finals

Final

Ulster Intermediate Club Hurling Championship

Ulster quarter-finals

Ulster semi-finals

Ulster final

All-Ireland Intermediate Club Hurling Championship

All-Ireland quarter-final

All-Ireland semi-finals

All-Ireland final

Championship statistics

Miscellaneous

 A fixtures backlog in the Tipperary Intermediate Hurling Championship resulted in Cappoquin being handed a walkover in the Munster quarter-final. Moyne-Templetuohy eventually won the county championship but were denied reentry to the provincial championship.

References

All-Ireland Intermediate Club Hurling Championship
All-Ireland Intermediate Club Hurling Championship
All-Ireland Intermediate Club Hurling Championship